Barbora Lukáčová (born April 28, 1990 in Liptovský Mikuláš, Slovakia) is an alpine skier from Slovakia. She competed for Slovakia at the 2014 Winter Olympics in the alpine skiing events.

References

1990 births
Living people
Olympic alpine skiers of Slovakia
Alpine skiers at the 2014 Winter Olympics
Sportspeople from Liptovský Mikuláš
Slovak female alpine skiers